Hohenzieritz is a municipality in the district Mecklenburgische Seenplatte, in Mecklenburg-Vorpommern, Germany. Louise of Mecklenburg-Strelitz died here in 1810.

References